Swithinbank Range is a small range from the Churchill Mountains, extending eastward between Donnally and Ahern Glaciers to the west side of Starshot Glacier. Named by the New Zealand Geological Survey Antarctic Expedition (NZGSAE) (1959–60) for Charles W. Swithinbank, glaciologist that season at Little America V.

Mountain ranges of Oates Land